Kazimir Vasilyevich Levitsky (February 1835 – November 22, 1890) was an Imperial Russian general and division commander. He took part in the war against the Ottoman Empire.

Awards
Order of Saint George, 4th degree, 1877
Order of Saint Stanislaus (House of Romanov), 1st class, 1877
Order of Saint Anna, 1st class, 1878
Order of Saint Vladimir, 2nd class, 1883
Order of the White Eagle (Russian Empire)

Sources
 Некрологи: «Новости», 1890 г., № 1890; «Новое время», 1890 г., № 5295.
 Витмер А. Н. Генерал Левицкий. СПб., 1912.
 
 Газенкампф М. А. Мой дневник 1877—78 гг. СПб., 1907.
 Гейсман П. А. Генерал К. В. Левицкий в 1877—78 гг. // «Русский инвалид», 1913, № 134.
 Глиноецкий Н. П. Исторический очерк Николаевской академии Генерального штаба. СПб., 1882
 М. Г. Генерал-лейтенант К. В. Левицкий // «Нива», 1891, № 4.
 Милорадович Г. А. Список лиц свиты их величеств с царствования императора Петра I по 1886 год. СПб., 1886
 Развёртка шаблонов // Русский биографический словарь : в 25 томах. — Санкт-Петербур—Москва, 1896—1918.
 Список генералам по старшинству на 1886 год

1835 births
1890 deaths
Recipients of the Order of Saint Stanislaus (Russian), 1st class
Russian military personnel of the Russo-Turkish War (1877–1878)
Recipients of the Order of St. Anna, 1st class
Recipients of the Order of St. Vladimir, 2nd class
Recipients of the Order of the White Eagle (Russia)